Dormer Cottage is a  Grade II listed building on Washbrook Lane, in the Allesley area of the City of Coventry, in the West Midlands of England. The house was probably constructed in the mid-17th century and extended in the 20th century.

The building is a timber frame construction, decorated with pebbledash on the exterior, and consists of a single story with an attic. Decorative windows were added in the 20th century, along with a porch, which covers the front door.

References

Grade II listed buildings in the West Midlands (county)
Buildings and structures in Coventry